Judge Hatchett is an American arbitration-based reality court show, produced and distributed by Sony Pictures Television. The series premiered on September 4, 2000 and ran for eight seasons until its cancellation on May 23, 2008. It was Sony Pictures' first court show.

This series is unrelated to the Glenda Hatchett series that started in 2016, The Verdict With Judge Hatchett, which is produced by Entertainment Studios.

Judge Glenda Hatchett

The series starred Glenda Hatchett and was modeled after other "court shows" such as Judge Judy and the long running The People's Court, as well as containing elements from tabloid talk shows such as Sally Jessy Raphael and Maury Povich. In addition to dealing with traditional small-claims lawsuits (with a plaintiff, defendant, and monetary awards sought), she also handled DNA paternity tests and out of control teens. Originally, gentle and compassionate, Hatchett would later become a more scurrilous and scalding disciplinarian, intent on teaching young people a lesson by sending them on corrective trips. The show would follow these youths on the corrective trips that Hatchett sent them on.

Judge Hatchett ran interventions for troubled teens. Among Judge Hatchett's recommendations for intervention and other help were Tommy the Clown, an eighteen-year-old mayor, prisons and Yolanda King (daughter of Martin Luther King Jr.). On one occasion, Judge Hatchett ran an intervention herself, running the building of an outdoor theater which ended up being named after her as a thanks. It was filmed at the Chelsea Studios in New York City.

After Judge Hatchett drew low ratings and key ABC Owned and Operated Stations began dropping the show, SPT made the decision to cancel the show. It has continued in reruns since then. Reruns aired on Black Entertainment Television, and was also offered by Sony in a barter package meant for low-rated stations looking to find content between 2010 and 2012. Reruns also aired on WE TV for a short time in late 2014.

References

External links
 
 

2000 American television series debuts
2008 American television series endings
American comedy television series
2000s American legal television series
First-run syndicated television programs in the United States
Court shows
Television series by Sony Pictures Television